Edgar Wells Page (31 December 1884 – 12 May 1956) was an English former field hockey player, who won a gold medal with the Great Britain team at the 1908 Summer Olympics in London.  He also played cricket for Staffordshire in the Minor Counties Championship from 1905 to 1927, as well as playing a single first-class match for the Minor Counties against HDG Leveson-Gower's XI in 1924.

References

External links
 

1884 births
1956 deaths
English male field hockey players
English Olympic medallists
Olympic field hockey players of Great Britain
British male field hockey players
Field hockey players at the 1908 Summer Olympics
Olympic gold medallists for Great Britain
English cricketers
Staffordshire cricketers
Minor Counties cricketers
Olympic medalists in field hockey
Medalists at the 1908 Summer Olympics